Morgan's Hill Enclosure is an archaeological site in Wiltshire, England, on Morgan's Hill south-east of Calne, about  north of the Wansdyke. It is a scheduled monument.

Description
There are three entrances around the rectangle, but it is not known if these are original.

There was some excavation in 1909: some medieval pottery was found at the surface, but nothing was found that could clearly relate to its original construction.

Purpose
Enclosures like this are considered to show evidence of agricultural practices, from the Neolithic period to the Romano-British period; they were stock pens or protected areas for crops.

See also
 List of prehistoric structures in Great Britain

References

Scheduled monuments in Wiltshire
Archaeological sites in Wiltshire
Neolithic England